BidKind is an online charity auction site that raises funds for nonprofit organizations by offering users access to celebrities, prominent brands and unforgettable experiences. BidKind is a social enterprise that combines social bidding, entertainment and real-time engagement, as well as multi-lingual content in English, Spanish, and Brazilian Portuguese.

Launch

The company launched during the Cannes International Film Festival at the Paradis luncheon, featuring Actress Paz Vega, hosted by children's arts charity The Art of Elysium on May 16, 2014. The event featured actress Paz Vega, star of Grace of Monaco, the  Nicole Kidman Grace Kelly biopic that opened the Cannes Film Festival. BidKind hosted its first auction experience in conjunction with the launch, offering bidders a chance to win Cannes Film Festival Passes, Round-Trip Travel and 5 Day Hotel Stay for Two.

BidKind hosted its first auction experience in conjunction with the launch, offering bidders a chance to win Cannes Film Festival Passes, Round-Trip Travel and 5 Day Hotel Stay for Two.

Following the launch at Cannes, BidKind auctioned an experience to “Meet James Franco with 2 VIP tickets to a preview screening of Child of God on August 1st in LA, followed by an intimate dinner party”. James Franco posted to his social media fan base of 12.8M to promote the auction and BidKind generated nearly four times the estimated value for the benefiting charity, The Art of Elysium.

On September 27, 2014, the Global Poverty Project held its third annual Global Citizen Festival held in New York City's Central Park that gathered over 60,000 attendees. BidKind was the exclusive charity fundraising partner of the Global Citizen Festival for the Global Poverty Project.

Speakers included UN Secretary-General Ban Ki-moon, Prime Minister of India, Narendra Modi, Prime Minister of Norway, Erna Solberg, a video message from President Barack Obama, actor Hugh Jackman, and musical performances from Jay-Z, Beyonce, No Doubt, Carrie Underwood and more. BidKind auctioned off exclusive experiences at the 2014 Global Citizen Festival with Hugh Jackman, Gwen Stefani and No Doubt, and Carrie Underwood to raise funds for the Global Poverty Project.

Following close on the heels of these experiences, BidKind again partnered with the Global Poverty Project, auctioning backstage access and a meet-and-greet with chart-topping rapper Wiz Khalifa at the concert opening the 2014 Forbes 40 Under 40 Summit in Philadelphia, PA on October 19, 2014.

BidKind continued to work with internationally acclaimed artists and causes, in October 2014, hosting its first auctions in Brazil – meet-and-greets with Linkin Park at their shows in Brasilia and Belo Horizonte. Both auctions benefitted Music for Relief, an organization founded by Linkin Park in the wake of the 2004 Indian Ocean tsunami to provide disaster relief around the world.

BidKind also partnered with French pop star and actor, Patrick Bruel, hosting auctions for meet-and-greets with Bruel in six US cities, including Miami, New York, Boston, Washington, D.C., Houston, and Los Angeles, helping to promote his November 2014 United States tour, as well as his charity of choice, Sec. Hillary Clinton's women's initiative, Vital Voices.

In its first four months out of Beta, BidKind has reached over 150M people through celebrities promoting their BidKind experiences for charity on their social media channels.

Featured auctions and charities
Highlights of BidKind auctions to date include:

 Meet James Franco with two VIP tickets to a preview screening of Child of God on August 1, in LA followed by an intimate dinner party. Benefitting: The Art of Elysium
 Meet Linkin Park at their show in Brasilia, Brazil on October 19. Benefitting: Music For Relief
 Meet Carrie Underwood at the 2014 Global Citizen Festival with 2 VIP tickets to the show on September 27 in NYC. Benefitting: Global Poverty Project
 Meet Hugh Jackman at the 2014 Global Citizen Festival with 2 VIP tickets to the show on September 27 in NYC. Benefitting: Global Poverty Project
 Meet No Doubt at the 2014 Global Citizen Festival with 2 VIP tickets to the show on September 27 in NYC. Benefitting: Global Poverty Project
 Two VIP tickets to the sold out Ringo Starr concert at The Greek in LA on Saturday, July 19 with a photo and personal gift. Benefitting: The Art of Elysium

International auctions and charities
Meet Linkin Park at their show in Brasilia, Brazil on October 19, 2014. Benefiting: Music for Relief. 
Two exclusive tickets to the Formula One Grand Prix of Monaco and luxury travel. Benefitting: The SD Foundation. 
Cannes Film Festival Passes, round-trip travel and 5 day hotel stay for two. Benefiting: The SD Foundation. 
Meet Patrick Bruel, French singer and actor, in New York City, Boston, Los Angeles, and Houston. Benefiting: Hillary Clinton's Vital Voices.

Charity partners
Auction proceeds support the work of nonprofit organizations including: Global Poverty Project, The Art of Elysium, Music For Relief, Best Friends Animal Society, The Edeyo Foundation, Vital Voices, DCTV, The American Cancer Society, Common Ground HIV, New Orleans Musicians Clinic, The American Friends of Blérancourt, Sentebale, and Del Sole Foundation for The Arts and Humanities.

Celebrity participants
James Franco, Hugh Jackman, Carrie Underwood, Wiz Khalifa, No Doubt, Linkin Park, Paris Hilton, Stevie Wonder, Lance Bass, Ringo Starr,  Sonja Morgan, Julia Stiles, Nacho Figueras, Patrick Bruel, Rebecca DaCosta, Lee Foss, Anabel Englund, Jeremy Redleaf, and others.

References

External links 
BidKind http://www.bidkind.com

American companies established in 2014
Online auction websites of the United States
American fundraising websites
2014 establishments in New York City